Guru Vandana means “Reverence for the Teacher” – it is the thanksgiving from a student to a teacher, expressing their gratitude. The Guru Vandana program provides a platform for students to honor their teachers for imparting knowledge and wisdom to them.

Guru

The concept of Guru is as old as humanity itself. Primarily, the word Guru means a '[[teacher]' and as such it is a universal concept based on the idea of transmitting knowledge from a person, who knows something, to an ignorant student or disciple. In an extended view, a Guru can also be a priest, a rabbi, a master, a school teacher, even a father or a mother. Guru does not mean a teacher imparting formal training but a person who contributes to the overall development and learning of an individual. The syllable gu means darkness, the syllable ru, he who dispels them, because of the power to dispel darkness, the guru is thus named.

Guru transforms his disciple through his presence and spiritual knowledge. According to RamaKrishna Prarahamsa Spiritual knowledge can not be attained completely by reading books. But for obtaining complete spiritual enlightenment Guru’s presence is a must. Only when there is a strong bond between Guru and Shishya can spiritual enlightenment occur.

Origins of Guru Shishya Parampara

Thus our great sanathana dharma tradition has been enriched by the Guru-Sishya relationship. Lord Rama's greatness lay in His relationship with His most loyal disciple Hanuman who taught the essence of Ramanamamritim. Lord Krishna gave us the Bhagavad Gita, thanks to his devoted and most trusted disciple Arjuna. Saint Ramakrishna Paramahamsa gave to the world Swami Vivekananda who in turn gave to the world the Ramakrishna Mission, embodying the soul of India. Saint Thyagaraja, an avatar of Sage Valmiki, composed hundreds of soulful Krithis in praise of God. Two Krithis, in particular, refer to the gurus' role in guiding the seeker on the right path. Guru leka in 'Gowrimanohari' raga is a Krithi in which the Saint of Thiruvaiyar sings how one who is trapped in the jungle of desire, can come out of it with help of the right Guru.  Saint Thyagaraja says however learned and good a person might be, life would be meaningless without the guidance of a Satguru.  In another Krithi, Sri Naradamuni Gururaya ganti in Bhairavi raga, Thyagaraja explains how Satguru Smaranam helps to free one of ignorance.

In modern times

American Hindu Education Foundation (HEF) had conducted the program in Houston in which over 30 teachers and a principal were honored by students. Children from Houston Balagokulams area picked up their favorite teachers. Acharya Premchand Sridhar of Arya Samaj Houston presided over the program. The program started with Sridhar lighting the lamp and it was followed by cultural programs and with the explanation of Hindu Concept of Gurus. After the felicitation of teachers Veda Vrinda group chanted the section of the Taittariya Upanishad known as the Vedic Commencement Address.

Guruvandana is also performed by disciples to spiritual masters. During GuruVandana program GuruGita is recited by disciple to honor his guru. GuruGita forms section of Skanda Purana. In Bangalore Guruvandana was offered to Sankaracharya of Kanchi Kamakoti Peetam, Sri Jayendra Saraswathi. Despite rains, a crowd gathered in Malleshwaram to felicitate their Spiritual Guru. In ISKCON temples Guruvandana, written by the great vaisnava acarya Visvanatha Cakravarti Thakur, is performed for spiritual Guru Srila Prabhupada throughout the year.

In other religions

Apart from Hinduism Guru-Shishya concept is followed in other religions like Jain, Sikh, Buddhism. In fact the word Sikh has origins from Sanskrit 'shishya'. Jains celebrate Guru Vandana as part of their rituals.

References 

 Kanchi seer felicitation
 Guruvandana in Houston
 Guruvandana in Houston 

Hindu philosophical concepts